John S. Harrison Jr. (born 1948) is an American filmmaker, musician, and composer best known for his collaborations with director George A. Romero and for writing-directing the miniseries adaptation of Dune.

Early life and career
Harrison was born and raised in Pittsburgh, Pennsylvania. He graduated from Emerson College in Boston with a BS in Theater Arts and is an MFA graduate of Carnegie Mellon University's School of Drama. For several years after that, he performed on the road with his band Homebrew before moving back to Pittsburgh to take a master's degree in film and television from Carnegie Mellon University. At the same time, he joined blues guitarist Roy Buchanan, with whom he toured across the US and internationally for four years. He was also featured on several of Buchanan's albums, including That's What I'm Here For (1974), Live Stock (1975), and A Street Called Straight (1976).

In 1973, Harrison and his friends, Dusty Nelson and Pasquale Buba, formed a film production company eventually named The Image Works to produce commercials and industrials in the Pittsburgh area. This partnership eventually led to the production of the film Effects (1980), which Harrison produced and performed in as the character Lacey Bickle. In 1974, Harrison began a long collaboration and friendship with filmmaker George A. Romero. Harrison performed as Sir Pelinore in Romero's Knightriders, then became his 1st Assistant Director for both Romero films Creepshow (1982) and Day of the Dead (1985).

Harrison also composed the scores for Creepshow and Day of the Dead (1985). He also played the "Screwdriver Zombie" in Romero's classic Dawn of the Dead (1978). The music that was composed for the score of Creepshow was also featured in the fake trailer for Thanksgiving in the film Grindhouse (2007), and the South Park episode "Tegridy Farms Halloween Special" (2019). Music from Harrison's Day of the Dead score was also featured in the premiere Stranger Things Season 3, "Suzie, Do You Copy" (2019).

After Creepshow, Harrison moved to Los Angeles to continue his writing and directing career. He wrote, directed and composed the music for multiple episodes of the Tales from the Darkside TV show. He was then tapped by producer Richard P. Rubinstein to direct Tales from the Darkside: The Movie (1990) for Paramount, which won the Gran Prix du Festival at Avoriaz, France (1991). Harrison's collaboration with Rubinstein culminated in the Emmy-winning TV miniseries, Frank Herbert's Dune (2000), which Harrison wrote and directed, and Frank Herbert's Children of Dune (2003), which Harrison wrote and executive produced.

In 2001, Harrison receives a co-song writing credit, for the Gorillaz's track "M1 A1", from the album Gorillaz, which samples music (along with dialogue), from the film Day of the Dead. Gorillaz used samples from the same film for another song, "Hip Albatross", a B-side on the international hit "19-2000".

In 2006, Harrison reunited with mentor Romero to co-produce Romero's film Diary of the Dead (2007). His action suspense thriller Blank Slate for producer Dean Devlin, which Harrison wrote and directed, aired as a twenty episode mini-series on TNT in the fall of 2008. In 2009, Harrison completed his adaptation of acclaimed horror novelist Clive Barker's Book of Blood, which Harrison co-wrote and directed.

His paranormal thriller miniseries Residue (2015), which he created and wrote, was released on Netflix in April 2015.

Harrison has written and directed episodes of Creepshow on Shudder.

Filmography

Films

Television series

Soundtracks
Effects – LaLa Land Records (LLLCD1040), Los Angeles
Creepshow – LaLa Land Records (LLLCD1007), Los Angeles
Day of the Dead – Taurus Entertainment/Numenorean Music, Los Angeles
Tales from the Darkside: The Movie – GNP Crescendo (GNPD 8021), Los Angeles
Creepshow – Waxwork Records LP, New Orleans
Day of the Dead – Waxwork Records LP, New Orleans
Tales from the Darkside: The Movie – Waxwork Records LP, New Orleans

Books
Carson, Phil. Roy Buchanan, American Axe (San Francisco: Backbeat Books 2001)
Larson, Randall D. Musique Fantastique (London: The Scarecrow Press 1985)
Gagne, Paul R. The Zombies That Ate Pittsburgh: the Films of George A. Romero  (New York: Dodd, Mead 1987)
Newman, Kim. Nightmare Movies: A Critical History of the Horror Film 1968–1988 (1988)
Harrison, John. Destiny Gardens, A Novel (Los Angeles: House Bean Boy 2013)
Fischera, J. Blake. Scored to Death 2; More Conversations With Some of Horror's Greatest Composers (Los Angeles: Silman-James Press 2020)

References

External links

American film producers
American film score composers
American television composers
American television directors
American television writers
American male television writers
Carnegie Mellon University College of Fine Arts alumni
Emerson College alumni
Living people
Artists from Pittsburgh
1948 births